Nebria taketoi is a species of black coloured ground beetle in the Nebriinae subfamily that is endemic to Japan.

References

taketoi
Beetles described in 1962
Beetles of Asia
Endemic fauna of Japan